For the 1989–90 season, Norwich City F.C. competed in Football League Division One, as well as the FA Cup, League Cup and Full Members' Cup.

Overview
The previous season had been Norwich City's most successful to that point, with the club finishing fourth in Division One and reaching the semi-finals of the FA Cup, so they might have been expected to be in competition to win one or more trophies. This, however, was not to be the case. While Norwich never looked in danger of being relegated from the top flight, they would finish mid-table and be eliminated early from all three cup competitions.

Although they defeated Brighton & Hove Albion 5–0 in the Full Members' Cup, they would not win a league game by more than 2–0, which they achieved eight times. Their heaviest defeat was 4–0 away at Tottenham. The highest scoring game was a 4–4 home draw with Southampton.

Squad
Squad at end of season (5 May 1990)

Transfers

In

Out

Loans In

Loans Out

Final table

Results

Division One

FA Cup

League Cup

Full Members Cup

 Source:

Appearances

 Source:

Goalscorers

 Source:

References

Bibliography 
  
 Barclays League Club Directory 1991: Editor Tony Williams 

Norwich City F.C. seasons
Norwich City